Sakskøbing, previously spelled Sakskjøbing, is a town with a population of 4,595 (1 January 2022). Until 1 January 2007 it was the seat of the former Sakskøbing Municipality (Danish, kommune) in Guldborgsund Municipality in Region Sjælland on the northeast coast of the island of Lolland in south Denmark.

The water tower in Sakskøbing, nicknamed "Saxine" or "the smiling water tower", is a 33 meter tall water tower and a landmark for the town. The tower was built in 1908 by Christiani & Nielsen, but did not receive its smile until 1982, when the architect Flemming Skude decorated it.

Sakskøbing Church

Sakskøbing Church is a late Romanesque brick building with a late Gothic tower. It was built around the year 1200; in the following centuries, the original church was extended with a nave and tower. The present spire, which is 48 metres high, was built in 1852.

Sakskøbing Municipality
The former Sakskøbing Municipality, including the small island of Vigsø, covered an area of 176 km², and had a total population of 9,299 (2005). Its last mayor was Kaj Petersen a member of the Social Democrats (Socialdemokraterne) political party. To the north is Tår's Cove (Tårs Vig) and beyond that Rågø Strait (Rågø Sund), the waterway which separates Lolland from Zealand. A finger of Rågø Strait cuts into the former municipality forming Sakskøbing Fjord and then Sakskøbing River (Sakskøbing å) which meanders through the former municipality, as well as through Nykøbing Falster and Nysted until it terminates near the town of Bregninge.

On 1 January 2007 Sakskøbing Municipality ceased to exist as the result of Kommunalreformen ("The Municipality Reform" of 2007). It was merged with existing Nykøbing Falster, Nysted, Nørre Alslev, Stubbekøbing, and Sydfalster municipalities to form the new Guldborgsund Municipality. This created a municipality with an area of 907 km² and a total population of 63,533 (2005). The new municipality belongs to Region Sjælland (Region Zealand).

Notable people 

 Christopher II of Denmark (1276–1332), King of Denmark 1320 to 1326 and 1329 to 1332. He was given a simple house at Sakskøbing shortly before his death.
 Peter Ilsted (1861–1933), a Danish artist and printmaker of domestic interior scenes
 Jon Iversen (1889–1964), a Danish stage and film actor and film director
 Philip R. Rosendahl (1893–1974), journalist and acting governor of North Greenland 1925 to 1928 and Governor 1929 to 1939
 Svend Erik Hovmand (born 1945), a Danish politician. He was Tax Minister 2001 to 2004.
 Troels Gustavsen (born 1988), a Danish singer/songwriter

Sport 
 Carl Andersen (1879–1967), a Danish gymnast who competed in the 1908 Summer Olympics and became a neo-baroque architect
 Arnold Schwartz (1901–1975), a Danish rower. He competed at the 1928 Summer Olympics.
 Berit Kristensen (born 1983), a Danish team handball player. He plays for Randers HK and Denmark.
 René Holten Poulsen (born 1988), a sprint canoeist, silver medallist at the 2008 Summer Olympics
 Jens Stryger Larsen (born 1991), a footballer who plays for Udinese and has 28 caps for Denmark

References

 Municipal statistics: NetBorger Kommunefakta, delivered from KMD aka Kommunedata (Municipal Data)
 Municipal mergers and neighbors: Eniro new municipalities map

External links

 Guldborgsund municipality's official website (Danish only)
 Fællesrådet for Sakskøbing og Omegn's website (Danish only)
 Sakskøbing ermakvagus.com
 Weather forecast Sakskøbing, Denmark weather-atlas.com

Former municipalities of Denmark
Cities and towns in Region Zealand
Guldborgsund Municipality
Lolland